Felice Torelli (9 September 1667 – 11 June 1748) was an Italian painter of the Baroque style, active mainly in Bologna.

Biography
He was born to a family of artists in Verona, including his brother, Giuseppe Torelli, a noted violinist and composer of concerti. Both his son, Stefano Torelli, and his wife, Lucia Casalini (1677–1762), were painters. His wife mainly painted portraits. Felice was initially apprenticed to Santi Prunati in Verona, then to Giovanni Gioseffo dal Sole in Bologna. In 1710, Torelli was one of the founders of the Accademia Clementina in Bologna, and during his time there, Giuseppe Maria Crespi was a member.  Torelli's pupils at the academy included the two brothers Ubaldo Gandolfi and Gaetano Gandolfi; his nephew, Giovanni Giorgi; Mariano Collina (died 1780); and Antonio Magnoni

He painted a Martyrdom of St. Maurelius for Ferrara Cathedral. He painted St Vincent in the act of curing a lunatic woman for the church of the Dominicans in Faenza. Other altarpieces were painted for churches in Rome, Turin, Milan, and other cities in Italy.

See also
 Lovia Casalina

References

 Web gallery of Art Biography
 Grove Encyclopedia of Art Biography.
 Virgin with child and Saints
Dwight C.  Miller: "Felice Torelli" (subscription version of Grove Art Online). Oxford University Press.

External links

1667 births
1748 deaths
Italian Baroque painters
Painters from Bologna
17th-century Italian painters
Italian male painters
18th-century Italian painters
18th-century Italian male artists